Detaille Island is a small island off the northern end of the Arrowsmith Peninsula in Graham Land, Antarctica. From 1956 to 1959 it was home to "Base W" of the British Antarctic Survey and closed after the end of the International Geophysical Year (IGY). It is now often visited by Antarctic cruise ships but is otherwise unoccupied.

Thanks to the men's hasty departure and the necessity that they take little with them, Base W is an eerily preserved time capsule of 1950s Antarctic life. The base had been intended to host dog-sledging survey parties which would cross the sea ice to the nearby Antarctic Peninsula, but the ice was dangerously unstable. So the men were forced to close up the base, load sledges with only their most valuable gear and use dog teams to reach the ship.

Station W
Station W was established in 1956 as a British research station primarily for survey, geology and meteorology and to contribute to the International Geophysical Year in 1957. It consists of a hut and associated structures and outbuildings, including a small emergency storage building, bitch and pup pens, anemometer tower, and two tubular steel radio masts. As a relatively unaltered research station of the late 1950s, it provides a reminder of the science and living conditions that existed when the Antarctic Treaty was first signed in 1959.

In 2009, the base was designated a Historic Site and Monument (HSM 83), following a proposal by the United Kingdom to the Antarctic Treaty Consultative Meeting.

Artefacts include a Hoover washing machine with instruction manuals, jackets and longjohns, a calendar from December 1957, survey books, astronomical observation logs, radio communication equipment, numerous books, dozens of paint-size cans of Scotch oats, bottles of Heinz mayonnaise, and empty bottles of gin and whisky.

Detaille Island is maintained by the United Kingdom Antarctic Heritage Trust. The organization works to conserve Antarctic buildings and artefacts, and to promote and encourage the public's interest in its Antarctic heritage.

The normal occupancy of Station W was eight to 10 people, according to an information panel. In addition to the main building, there are two nearby huts. One was used as an emergency store and the other to keep dogs.

See also
 List of Antarctic and subantarctic islands
 List of Antarctic research stations
 List of Antarctic field camps
 Crime in Antarctica

References

External links
Antarctic Treaty Visitor Site Guide
Antarctic Heritage Trust Information Sheet
Station W in 2008
Antarctic Heritage Trust - Detaille Blog

Islands of Graham Land
Loubet Coast
Historic Sites and Monuments of Antarctica
Tourism in Antarctica
Former populated places in Antarctica